Dushyant Singh Chauhan is an Indian rower and an Indian Army Junior commission officer from the village of Kulana Jhajjar Haryana. He born in Delhi and primarily competes in single scull events. In 2014 he won bronze at the Asian games won the bronze medal in the Men's lightweight single sculls at the 2014 Asian Games, Incheon  and the 2018 Asian Games, Jakarta. He is supported by the GoSports Foundation.

Achievements

Asian Rowing Championships

Asian Games

References

External links
 

Indian male rowers
Rowers at the 2014 Asian Games
Asian Games medalists in rowing
Living people
Asian Games bronze medalists for India
Medalists at the 2014 Asian Games
Rowers at the 2018 Asian Games
Medalists at the 2018 Asian Games
1992 births